Adáshiba is a Hungarian play, written by Károly Szakonyi. It was first produced in 1970.

Hungarian plays
1970 plays